Cutheard of Lindisfarne (died  915) was Bishop of Lindisfarne from 899 to around 915, although the see was administered from Chester-le-Street.

Cutheard was responsible for purchasing the village of Bedlington in Northumberland, which was later incorporated into the properties belonging to the Bishopric of Durham when the sees were merged by Bishop Aldhun in 995.  It was this purchase that was later responsible for the parish becoming the exclave of County Durham known as Bedlingtonshire.

Citations

References

External links 
 
 

Bishops of Lindisfarne
10th-century English bishops
910s deaths
Year of birth unknown
Year of death uncertain